Longlands is an area of South East London that straddles the boundary of both the London Borough of Bexley and the Royal Borough of Greenwich. It lies north west of Sidcup and south east of Eltham.

Some old maps and records have the name as two words "Long Lands", and show it was in the Foots Cray/Sidcup parish in the Hundred of Ruxley.

Found within Longlands 

On Main Road there are a small number of shops including: two showrooms, which are Peugeot and Kia showrooms, an off license/convenience store, a fish and chip shop, a restaurant, a launderette and a small post office. Shops here seem to be somewhat over shadowed by nearby larger towns, New Eltham and especially Sidcup. Within Longlands the place gives it name to Longlands Recreation Ground, Longlands Primary School, Longlands Road and Longlands Park Crescent. Also things found within the ward of Longlands include Queen Mary's Hospital, Frognal Corner Roundabout, Sidcup Fire Station, Sidcup Place, two primary schools, Longlands primary school and Dulverton Primary School, one secondary school, St Mary and St Joseph's Catholic School, and a small college. These are all part of the Sidcup post town, with the exception of Dulverton Primary School which occupies the small westerly part of the ward that overlaps into the SE9 Postcode district, that is within the London post town. The small river Wyncham Stream also flows from Chislehurst northward through Longlands toward Lamorbey and finally into the River Shuttle.

Transport

Rail
The closest National Rail stations to Longlands are New Eltham and Sidcup.

Buses
Longlands is served by two Transport for London bus services.
233 to Eltham and to Swanley via Sidcup
321 to New Cross via Eltham and Lewisham and to Foots Cray via Sidcup (24 Hour Service)

Roads
Two A roads pass through Longlands, the A20 "Sidcup By-Pass Road", a dual carriageway, which runs from New Cross until it joins the M20 in Swanley, and the A211 called "Foots Cray Road" and "Main Road". They both run from northwest to southeast, the A20 being the southernmost; on both these roads Longlands sits between New Eltham and Sidcup. An odd fact about the area is these A roads begin some distance apart, come closer together, they then run parallel for a short length at Longlands but move apart again without ever directly meeting; This makes the area recognizable on a map. A large concrete wall stands here separating the roads as they run parallel.

References

External links
Longlands Ward on Bexley council website
Map of Longlands Ward on Bexley council website. (Ordnance Survey map ©Crown 2006)

Districts of the London Borough of Bexley
Districts of the London Borough of Bromley
Districts of the Royal Borough of Greenwich
Areas of London
Sidcup